The 2015 IPC Alpine Skiing World Championships was an international disability sport alpine skiing event held in Panorama Mountain Village, British Columbia, Canada from March 2 to 10, 2015. The Championship is held biannually by the International Paralympic Committee (IPC) and is the largest event of its type outside the Winter Paralympics.

Skiers competed in sitting, standing or visually impaired classification categories in Downhill, Giant Slalom, Slalom, Super-G, Super Combined and Team events.

Over 130 skiers competed, with Russia finishing the Championship on top of the medal table in both gold medals won and total medals.

This proved to be the last event under the title of "IPC Alpine Skiing World Championships". On 30 November 2016, the IPC, which serves as the international governing body for 10 disability sports, including Alpine skiing, adopted the "World Para" branding for all of those sports. The world championships in said sports were immediately rebranded as "World Para" events. Accordingly, from 2017 forward, the event will be known as the "World Para Alpine Skiing Championships".

Opening ceremony
On March 2, the opening ceremony was held.

Events

Men

Women

Medals table

Key

Participating nations
Over 130 participants from 22 nations competed.

Classifications
Skiers compete in sitting, standing or visually impaired events, depending on their classification of disability.

Standing
LW2 – single leg amputation above the knee
LW3 – double leg amputation below the knee, mild cerebral palsy, or equivalent impairment
LW4 – single leg amputation below the knee
LW5/7 – double arm amputation
LW6/8 – single arm amputation
LW9 – amputation or equivalent impairment of one arm and one leg

Sitting
LW 10 – paraplegia with no or some upper abdominal function and no functional sitting balance
LW 11 – paraplegia with fair functional sitting balance
LW 12 – double leg amputation above the knees, or paraplegia with some leg function and good sitting balance

Visually impaired
B1 – no functional vision
B2 – up to ca 3–5% functional vision
B3 – under 10% functional vision

References

External links
Winter Sport Classification, Canadian Paralympic Committee
official site
IPC Alpine Skiing
World Championships – official results
ParalympicSport.TV

World Para Alpine Skiing Championships
IPC
IPC
Sports competitions in British Columbia